This is a list of the mammal species recorded in Saint Martin. Of the mammals of Saint Martin, only bats are native. Apart from bats, many oceanic mammals, exotic mammals and domesticated species can be found within and around the island. Native rodents, such as the blunt-toothed giant hutia and oryzomyines, are known to extirpated from the island due to the impact of humans, where a few oryzomyines can be found around archeological sites.

Table
The following tags are used to highlight each species' conservation status as assessed by the International Union for Conservation of Nature:

Some species were assessed using an earlier set of criteria. Species assessed using this system have the following instead of near threatened and least concern categories:

Subclass: Theria

Order: Sirenia (manatees and dugongs) 

Sirenia is an order of fully aquatic, herbivorous mammals that inhabit rivers, estuaries, coastal marine waters, swamps, and marine wetlands. All four species are endangered.

Family: Trichechidae
Genus: Trichechus
 West Indian manatee, T. manatus  extirpated

Order: Chiroptera (bats)

Bats comprised 20% of all mammals described in the world and they are the only true-fliers among mammali. Saint Martin is home for seven bat species.

Family: Noctilionidae
Genus: Noctilio
 Greater bulldog bat, Noctilio leporinus ssp. mastivus LR/lc
Family: Phyllostomidae
Subfamily: Glossophaginae
Genus: Monophyllus
 Antillean fruit-eating bat, Brachyphylla cavernarum LC
Genus: Monophyllus
 Insular single leaf bat, Monophyllus plethodon ssp. luciae LR/nt
Subfamily: Stenodermatinae
Genus: Ardops
 Tree bat, Ardops nichollsi LR/nt
Genus: Artibeus
 Jamaican fruit bat, Artibeus jamaicensis LR/lc
Family: Natalidae
Genus: Natalus
 Mexican funnel-eared bat, Natalus stramineus ssp. stramineus LR/lc
Family: Molossidae
Genus: Tadarida
 Mexican free-tailed bat, Tadarida brasiliensis ssp. antillularum LR/nt
Genus: Molossus
 Velvety free-tailed bat, Molossus molossus ssp. molossus LR/lc

Order: Cetacea (whales)

The order Cetacea which includes whales, dolphins and porpoises, are the mammals most fully adapted to aquatic life which enable them to survive like fish in the water. They are armored with thick blubber, limbs evolved as fins and also with tail fin.

Suborder: Mysticeti
Family: Balaenopteridae (baleen whales)
Genus: Balaenoptera 
 Common minke whale, Balaenoptera acutorostrata
 Sei whale, Balaenoptera borealis
 Bryde's whale, Balaenoptera brydei
 Blue whale, Balaenoptera musculus
Genus: Megaptera
 Humpback whale, Megaptera novaeangliae
Suborder: Odontoceti
Superfamily: Platanistoidea
Family: Delphinidae (marine dolphins)
Genus: Delphinus
 Short-beaked common dolphin, Delphinus delphis DD
Genus: Feresa
 Pygmy killer whale, Feresa attenuata DD
Genus: Globicephala
 Short-finned pilot whale, Globicephala macrorhyncus DD
Genus: Lagenodelphis
 Fraser's dolphin, Lagenodelphis hosei DD
Genus: Grampus
 Risso's dolphin, Grampus griseus DD
Genus: Orcinus
 Killer whale, Orcinus orca DD
Genus: Peponocephala
 Melon-headed whale, Peponocephala electra DD
Genus: Pseudorca
 False killer whale, Pseudorca crassidens DD
Genus: Stenella
 Pantropical spotted dolphin, Stenella attenuata DD
 Clymene dolphin, Stenella clymene DD
 Striped dolphin, Stenella coeruleoalba DD
 Atlantic spotted dolphin, Stenella frontalis DD
 Spinner dolphin, Stenella longirostris DD
Genus: Steno
 Rough-toothed dolphin, Steno bredanensis DD
Genus: Tursiops
 Common bottlenose dolphin, Tursiops truncatus
Family: Physeteridae (sperm whales)
Genus: Physeter
 Sperm whale, Physeter catodon DD
Family: Kogiidae (dwarf sperm whales)
Genus: Kogia
 Pygmy sperm whale, Kogia breviceps DD
 Dwarf sperm whale, Kogia sima DD
Superfamily Ziphioidea
Family: Ziphidae (beaked whales)
Genus: Mesoplodon
 Gervais' beaked whale, Mesoplodon europaeus DD)
Genus: Ziphius
 Cuvier's beaked whale, Ziphius cavirostris DD

Order: Carnivora (carnivorans)

Well over 250 species of carnivorans, they fill up the top ranks of any food web, and helps to control the population of herbivores.
Suborder: Pinnipedia 
Family: Phocidae (earless seals)
Genus: Neomonachus
 Caribbean monk seal, Neomonachus tropicalis EX

Order: Rodentia (rodents)

Rodents are the most successful mammals in the world, comprising more than 40% of all described mammal species. They are economically important animals, where most of them are pests and invasive species in human habitations.

Family: Muridae (rats and mice)
Subfamily: Murinae
Genus: Rattus
Black rat, Rattus rattus LC introduced
Genus: Mus
House mouse, Mus musculus LC introduced

See also
List of chordate orders
Lists of mammals by region
List of prehistoric mammals
Mammal classification
List of mammals described in the 2000s

Notes

References
  

Saint Martin
Sint Maarten-related lists
Collectivity of Saint Martin-related lists
 Mammals